Eaux-Bonnes ("good waters") is a commune in the Pyrénées-Atlantiques department in south-western France.

Description 
Eaux-Bonnes is close to the small town of Laruns. The village's waters were first documented in the middle of the 14th century.

The climate which characterizes the town is of "mountain climate", according to the typology of climates of France which then has eight major types of climates in metropolitan France.

Gourette is a winter sports resort located in the commune on the high mountain pass Col d'Aubisque.

History 

The historian Auguste Lorieux (1796–1842) died in Eaux-Bonnes.

Nearby to the north-west is the impressive villa Cockade, the construction of which is detailed in Dornford Yates's novel The House That Berry Built.

Population

See also
 Aas, a village in Eaux-Bonnes.
 Ossau Valley
Communes of the Pyrénées-Atlantiques department

References

Communes of Pyrénées-Atlantiques
Spa towns in France
Pyrénées-Atlantiques communes articles needing translation from French Wikipedia
Béarn